The East Formosan languages consist of various Formosan languages scattered across Taiwan, including Kavalan, Amis, and the extinct Siraya language. This grouping is supported by both Robert Blust and Paul Jen-kuei Li. Li considers the Siraya-speaking area in the southwestern plains of Taiwan to be the most likely homeland of the East Formosan speakers, where they then spread to the eastern coast of Taiwan and gradually migrated to the area of modern-day Taipei.

Languages
Kavalanic
Kavalan
Basay
Qauqaut
Amis-Sakizaya
Sakizaya
Amis
Sirayaic
Siraya
Taivoan–Makatao
Taivoan
Makatao

Luilang is often lumped together with the Ketagalan dialect of Basay, but is poorly attested and remains unclassified. Sagart posits it as a primary branch of Austronesian.

Evidence
Li presents the following criteria as evidence for an East Formosan subgrouping.

Merger of *C and *t as /t/
Merger of *D and *Z as /r/ or /l/ in Basay, as /z/ in Kavalan
Merger of *q, *H, *ʔɦ and zero
Merger of *j, *n, and *N as /n/
Shift of *k into /q/ and /q/ > /h/ (Basay only) before *a

Li notes that the split of *k into k and q (before *a) is shared exclusively by Basay and Kavalan. Like Kavalan and Basay, the Siraya language merges the patient-focus and locative-focus forms, although Amis distinguishes the two focus forms. Li also lists dozens of lexical innovations shared by the East Formosan languages.

The Basay, Kavalan, and Amis also share an oral tradition stating a common origin from an island called “Sinasay” or “Sanasay,” which is probably the Green Island of today.

References

Works Cited

 

 

Formosan languages
Languages of Taiwan